Anne Openshaw is a Canadian actress from Surrey, British Columbia. She is most noted for her recurring role as Alice Fitzpatrick in the television series Call Me Fitz, for which she was a Canadian Screen Award nominee for Best Supporting Actress in a Comedy Series at the 3rd Canadian Screen Awards in 2015.

She had a leading role as Kathleen Ford-McNeal in the 2007 television miniseries Across the River to Motor City, and played Lois Smart in the 2017 television film I Am Elizabeth Smart.

Filmography

Film

Television

References

External links

21st-century Canadian actresses
Canadian television actresses
Canadian film actresses
Actresses from British Columbia
People from Surrey, British Columbia
Living people
Year of birth missing (living people)